The 1938 South Australian Grand Prix was a motor race staged at the Lobethal Circuit in South Australia, Australia on 3 January 1938. It was held over 12 laps, a total distance of 100 miles.
The race, which was the second South Australian Grand Prix, was contested on a handicap basis with the first car starting 30 minutes before the "Scratch" car.

The race was won by South Australian Noel Campbell driving a Singer Bantam.

Race results

  

Notes:
 Race distance: 100 miles
 Starters: 24
 Finishers: 8
 Fastest Time: Reg Nutt, Day Special, 77 min 33 sec
 Fastest Lap: Colin Dunne, MG K3 Magnette, 6 min 17 sec, 83 mph

References

South Australian Grand Prix
Motorsport at Lobethal